Tarmo Kikerpill (born June 13, 1977) is a retired Estonian professional basketball player. He is 1.96 m (6ft 5in) in height and he played at the small forward or power forward position.

Pro career
Kikerpill started his professional basketball career in 1994 with Tartu Ülikool/Rock in the Estonian League. He won four Estonian League Championships with the team. 
In 2005, he moved abroad for the first time, joining the Polish League club Energy Czarn Slupsk.  After a brief return to Tartu Ülikool/Rock for the 2006-2007 season, Kikerpill re-joined Energy Czarn Slupsk, where he spent the 2007-2008 season.  In the summer of 2008, Kikerpill started playing with the famous Greek League club AEK Athens BC. After playing a year there, Kikerpill returned to Estonia to play for Valga/CKE Inkasso. In August 2010, Kikerpill announced his retirement from professional basketball.

Estonian national team
Kikerpill was also a member of the Estonian national basketball team.

Honours

Tartu Ülikool/Rock

 4-time Estonian Champion: (2000, 2001, 2004, 2007)
 4-time Estonian Cup Winner: (2000, 2001, 2002, 2004)

References

External links
 Player card on bbl.net
 Tarmo Kikerpill on FIBA.com
 Tarmo Kikerpill basketball profile on eurobasket.com

1977 births
Living people
People from Elva, Estonia
Estonian men's basketball players
Korvpalli Meistriliiga players
Tartu Ülikool/Rock players
AEK B.C. players
Estonian expatriate basketball people in Greece
Estonian expatriate basketball people in Poland
BC Valga players
University of Tartu alumni
Small forwards